Kārlis Zariņš (December 12, 1889 - December 20, 1978) was a Latvian writer. Zariņš' works are characterised by a focus on the strangeness of life, on the strange characters of people; sometimes mysticism is also found in them.

References 

1889 births
1978 deaths
Latvian writers